Encore is a compilation album by country singer Johnny Cash, released on Columbia Records in 1981 (see 1981 in music). Aside from a handful of songs from previous Cash records, including the hit single "(Ghost) Riders in the Sky", and "Song of the Patriot"; featuring Marty Robbins. The latter song was also released as a single, with minor chart success, as was "Without Love".

Track listing

Charts
Singles – Billboard (United States)

References

External links
 Luma Electronic's Johnny Cash discography listing

Encore
Encore
Encore